MV Empire MacMahon was an oil tanker converted to a merchant aircraft carrier or MAC ship.

MV Empire MacMahon was built by Swan Hunter, Wallsend under order from the Ministry of War Transport. She entered service as a MAC ship in December 1943; however, only her air crew and the necessary maintenance staff were naval personnel.  She was operated by Anglo-Saxon Petroleum Co.

She returned to merchant service as an oil tanker in 1946 and renamed Naninia and was eventually scrapped in Hong Kong in 1960.

External links
 FAA archive

References

Oil tankers
Empire MacMahon
Empire ships
1943 ships
Ships of Anglo-Saxon Petroleum